Unbreakable Kimmy Schmidt is an American web television sitcom created by Tina Fey and Robert Carlock, starring Ellie Kemper in the title role, that has streamed on Netflix since March 6, 2015. Originally set for a 13-episode first season on NBC for spring 2015, the show was sold to Netflix and given a two-season order. It ran for four seasons, ending on January 25, 2019. An interactive special premiered on May 12, 2020.

Throughout its run, the series received critical acclaim, with critic Scott Meslow calling it "the first great sitcom of the streaming era". The series received a total of 20 Primetime Emmy Award nominations, including four nominations for Outstanding Comedy Series.

Major awards

Critics' Choice Television Awards

Primetime Emmy Awards

Primetime Creative Arts Emmy Awards

Screen Actors Guild Awards

Television Critics Association Awards

Writers Guild of America Awards

Other Associations

Artios Awards

Black Reel Awards

Dorian Awards

Gotham Awards

Gracie Allen Awards

NAACP Image Awards

OFTA Awards

People's Choice Awards

Satellite Awards

Webby Awards

Awards and nominations for the cast

References

External links
 
 
 

Awards and nom
Unbreakable Kimmy Schmidt